Méribel Ice Palace is an indoor ice hockey arena in Méribel, France.  It was built in 1991 and held 8,000 people when it opened.  The ice hockey games from the 1992 Winter Olympics were held at this arena.  After the Olympics the name of the arena changed to the Patinoire Olympique (Olympic Skating Rink), the capacity was reduced to 2,400, and part of the arena was converted into a swimming pool, restaurant, and other uses.

References
1992 Winter Olympics official report. pp. 106–9. 

Venues of the 1992 Winter Olympics
Indoor arenas in France
Indoor ice hockey venues in France
Olympic ice hockey venues
Sports venues in Savoie
Sports venues completed in 1991